James Black (April 27, 1826 – December 22, 1890) was the fourth President of the University of Iowa, serving from 1868 to 1870.

Presidents of the University of Iowa
1826 births
1890 deaths
19th-century American educators